Dębia Góra  is a settlement in the administrative district of Gmina Osiek, within Starogard County, Pomeranian Voivodeship, in northern Poland.

For details of the history of the region, see History of Pomerania.

The settlement has a population of 17.

References

Villages in Starogard County